François Fénelon (1651-1715) was Archbishop of Cambrai, a French writer and theologian.

Fénelon may also refer to:

People 
 Bertrand de Salignac de la Mothe-Fénelon (1523–1589), French diplomat
 Fania Fénelon (1922–1983), French pianist, composer, and cabaret singer
 François de Salignac de la Mothe-Fénelon (missionary) (1641–1679), missionary in New France
 François Fénelon (1651–1715), French archbishop and writer
 François-Louis de Salignac de La Mothe-Fénelon (1722–1767), French soldier, governor of Martinique from 1763 to 1764.
 Gabard Fénélon (born 1981), Haitian footballer
 Gabriel-Jacques de Salignac de La Motte, marquis de Fénelon (1688–1746), French military commander and diplomat
 Maurice Fenelon (1834–1897), Irish-born educator, merchant and political figure in Newfoundland
 Philippe Fénelon (born 1952), French composer

Other uses 
 Lycée Fénelon, Paris, a secondary school in the Quartier latin
 Château de Fénelon, a château in Dordogne, France
 Fenelon, Nevada, a ghost town

See also
 Shamir Fenelon (b. 1994), English footballer